Congregationalism refers to Congregationalist polity, a form of church governance based on the local congregation.

It may also refer to:
 Congregational churches, a family of denominations within the Reformed tradition known for a congregationalist form of governance
Congregationalism in the United States, the Congregationalist tradition in the United States

See also
 Congregational Church (disambiguation)